John William Paden (April 13, 1902 - July 21, 1993)  was an American football coach. He served as the head football coach at Sterling College in Sterling, Kansas for one season, in 1945, compiling a record of 0–3.

Head coaching record

References

1902 births
1993 deaths
Sterling Warriors football coaches